Thyrotropes (also called thyrotrophs) are endocrine cells in the anterior pituitary which produce thyroid stimulating hormone (TSH) in response to thyrotropin releasing hormone (TRH). Thyrotropes consist around 5% of the anterior pituitary lobe cells. 

Thyrotropes appear basophilic in histological preparations.

See also 

Anterior pituitary
Hormone
List of human cell types derived from the germ layers

References

External links

Peptide hormone secreting cells
Human cells
Thyroid homeostasis